Kjell Samuelsson (born 22 August 1951) is a former Swedish footballer. He made 173 Allsvenskan appearances for Djurgårdens IF and scored 37 goals. He also spent time in the North American Soccer League with the San Jose Earthquakes and the San Diego Jaws.

References

External links
 NASL stats

Swedish footballers
Swedish expatriate footballers
Expatriate soccer players in the United States
Swedish expatriate sportspeople in the United States
Djurgårdens IF Fotboll players
1951 births
Living people
North American Soccer League (1968–1984) players
North American Soccer League (1968–1984) indoor players
San Jose Earthquakes (1974–1988) players
San Diego Jaws players
Association football defenders